Onela was according to Beowulf a Swedish king, the son of Ongentheow and the brother of Ohthere. He usurped the Swedish throne, but was killed by his nephew Eadgils, who won by hiring foreign assistance.

In Scandinavian sagas a Norwegian king by the same name exists, Áli (the Old Norse form of Onela, also rendered as Ole, Åle or Ale), who had the cognomen  ("from Oppland").

Etymology 
The name stems from the Proto-Norse *Anula (diminutive with l-suffix to a name starting with *Anu-, or directly of an appellative , "ancestor").

Beowulf 
In the Anglo-Saxon poem Beowulf, Onela plays a central part in the Swedish-Geatish wars. Onela and his brother Ohthere were the sons of the Swedish king Ongenþeow. When the Geatish king Hreðel died, Onela and Ohthere saw the opportunity to pillage in Geatland starting the Swedish-Geatish wars:

The war ended with Ongenþeow's death.

It is implied by the poem that Onela eventually became king, because Ohthere's two sons, Eanmund and Eadgils, had to seek refuge with Heardred, Hygelac's successor as king of the Geats. This caused Onela to attack the Geats. During the battle, Eanmund was killed by Onela's champion Weohstan and Heardred was killed as well, after which Onela returned home.

Eadgils, however, survived and later, Beowulf helped him avenge Eanmund by slaying Onela.

By a conjectural emendation of line 62 of this poem some editors represent Onela as the son-in-law of Healfdene/Halfdan king of Denmark.

Norse sagas 
The animosity between Eadgils and Onela also appears in Scandinavian tradition. In the Norse sagas, which were mostly based on Norwegian versions of Scandinavian legends, Onela seems to appear as Áli of Uppland, and is called Norwegian. By the time Ynglingatal was used as a source by Snorri Sturluson, there appears no longer to have been a Scandinavian tradition of Áli as a relation of Eadgils.

The earliest extant Scandinavian source where Onela appears is the 9th century skaldic poem Ynglingatal, Eadgils (Aðils) is called Onela's enemy. Ála is the genitive case of Áli, the Old Norse form of the name Onela.

In Skáldskaparmál, compiled by Snorri Sturluson and in Arngrímur Jónsson's Latin summary of Skjöldunga saga, the battle hinted at in Beowulf is treated in more detail.

Snorri first quotes the Kálfsvísa but only small parts of it:

Snorri then relates that Aðils was in war with a Norwegian king named Áli, and they fought in the Battle on the Ice of Lake Vänern. Aðils was married to Yrsa, the mother of Hrólfr (Hroðulf) and so sent an embassy to Hrólfr asking him for help against Áli. He would receive three valuable gifts in recompense. Hrólfr was involved in a war against the Saxons and could not come in person but sent his twelve berserkers, including Bödvar Bjarki. Áli died in the war, and Aðils took Áli's helmet Battle-boar and his horse Raven. The berserkers demanded three pounds of gold each in pay, and they demanded to choose the gifts that Aðils had promised Hrólfr, that is the two pieces of armour that nothing could pierce: the helmet battle-boar and the mailcoat Finn's heritage. They also wanted the famous ring Svíagris. Aðils considered the pay outrageous and refused.

In the Ynglinga saga, Snorri relates that king Eadgils fought hard battles with the Norwegian king who was called . They fought on the ice of Lake Vänern, where Áli fell and Adils won. Snorri relates that much is told about this event in the Skjöldunga saga, and that Adils took Hrafn (Raven), Áli's horse.

The Saga of the Skjöldungs is lost but in the end of the 16th century, Arngrímur Jónsson saved a piece of information from this saga in Latin. He wrote: There was animosity between king Adils of Sweden and the Norwegian king Áli of Uppland. They decided to fight on the ice of Lake Vänern. Adils won and took his helmet, chainmail and horse.

 Notes 

 Secondary sources 
Nerman, B., Det svenska rikets uppkomst''. Stockholm, 1925.

6th-century deaths
Characters in Beowulf
English heroic legends
People whose existence is disputed
Scandinavian folklore
Semi-legendary kings of Sweden
Year of birth unknown